The War of Art is a 2002 non-fiction book written by American author Steven Pressfield. The book highlights the forms of resistance faced by artists, entrepreneurs, athletes, and others who are trying to break through creative barriers. The book was followed by Do the Work in 2011.

References

External links 
 Official website

2002 non-fiction books
American non-fiction books
Books about creativity
Self-help books
Books by Steven Pressfield